Hier is the surname of:

 Ethel Glenn Hier (1889–1971), American composer, teacher and pianist
 Marvin Hier (born 1939), dean and founder of the Simon Wiesenthal Center

See also
 Walter Hiers (1893–1933), American silent film actor
 Filesystem Hierarchy Standard
 Hiers-Brouage, commune in France
 Haier, Chinese home appliances company